The Sinai Interim Agreement, also known as the Sinai II Agreement, was a diplomatic agreement signed by Egypt and Israel on September 4, 1975, with the intention of peacefully resolving territorial disputes. The signing ceremony took place in Geneva.

The agreement stated that the conflicts between the countries "shall not be resolved by military force but by peaceful means." It also called "for a further withdrawal in the Sinai and a new UN buffer zone." Thus, the agreement strengthened Israel's and Egypt's commitment to abiding by U.N. Resolution 338 and strengthened diplomatic relations between Egypt, Israel, and the United States.

The purpose of this agreement, in the eyes of the Egyptians, was to gain back as much of the Sinai Peninsula (which had been occupied by Israel since 1967) as they could through diplomacy. Although the agreement strengthened Egypt's relationship with the Western world, it diminished its relationships with other members of the Arab League (especially Syria and the Palestine Liberation Organization).

See also
 Arab–Israeli conflict
 Egypt–Israel peace treaty
 Israel–Egypt Disengagement Treaty of 1974
 Egypt–Israel relations

References

External links

Interim Agreement between Israel and Egypt, from the Knesset website

Republic of Egypt
Treaties of Israel
Arab–Israeli peace process
Treaties of Egypt
Treaties concluded in 1975
Egypt–Israel relations
Sinai Peninsula
September 1975 events in Africa
September 1975 events in Asia